Lykens Township may refer to the following townships in the United States:

 Lykens Township, Dauphin County, Pennsylvania
 Lykens Township, Crawford County, Ohio